Ivergny is a commune in the Pas-de-Calais department in northern France. It is located approximately 40 km north of Amiens.

See also
Communes of the Pas-de-Calais department

References

Communes of Pas-de-Calais